"Kiss Me When I'm Down" is a song written by Andrew Dorff, Josh Kear, and Chris Tompkins and recorded by American country music singer Gary Allan.  It was released in September 2010 as the third and final single from Allan's 2010 album Get Off on the Pain.

Critical reception 
Stormy Lewis of Roughstock calls the song “Another brilliant song to add to the cannon of amazing Gary Allan singles,” and gave it a five out of five star rating. Jim Malec of American Noise says that the lyrics are “Great. Not good, great,” and says the song “Deserves every single bit of acclaim and attention it will receive,” and gives the song a thumbs up.

Chart performance

References 

Songs about kissing
2010 singles
2010 songs
Country ballads
2010s ballads
Gary Allan songs
Songs written by Josh Kear
Songs written by Chris Tompkins
MCA Nashville Records singles
Song recordings produced by Mark Wright (record producer)
Songs written by Andrew Dorff
Song recordings produced by Greg Droman
MCA Records singles